The Whitstable Oyster Festival is an annual event held in Whitstable, Kent, England, each year to celebrate the town's links with the oyster industry.

See also
 Crassostrea gigas

References

External links
 

Food and drink festivals in the United Kingdom
Culture in Kent
Festivals in Kent
Whitstable
Annual events in England
Oyster festivals